Mohamed Hanipa bin Maidin (Jawi: محمد حنيفة بن ميدين) is a Malaysian politician who served as the Deputy Minister in the Prime Minister's Department in charge of legal affairs in the Pakatan Harapan (PH) administration under former Prime Minister Mahathir Mohamad and former Minister Liew Vui Keong from July 2018 to the collapse of the PH administration in February 2020 and the Member of Parliament (MP) for Sepang from May 2013 to November 2022. He is a member of the National Trust Party (AMANAH), a component party of the PH opposition coalition. and was a member of Malaysian Islamic Party (PAS). He and other progressive PAS leaders referred to as the G18 were ousted at the 2015 PAS Muktamar. This led them to launch Gerakan Harapan Baru (GHB), which took over the dormant Malaysian Workers' Party, after their attempt to form a new party called Parti Progresif Islam (PPI) was rejected by the Home Affairs Ministry. GHB was later rebranded as AMANAH with Mohamad Sabu as its 1st President.

Hanipa is a barrister by profession. He married Rohani Rohmat.

Election results

References

Living people
Place of birth missing (living people)
People from Johor
People from Batu Pahat
Malaysian people of Indian descent
Malaysian Muslims
20th-century Malaysian lawyers
National Trust Party (Malaysia) politicians
Malaysian Islamic Party politicians
Members of the Dewan Rakyat
International Islamic University Malaysia alumni
21st-century Malaysian politicians
1969 births